The 19th Rhythmic Gymnastics European Championships were held in Riesa, Germany, from 04 to 6 April 2003
37 groups and 17 individual gymnasts took part in this European Championships.
Medals were contested in three disciplines: senior groups, junior groups and senior individual finals.

Medal winners

Medal table

References 

Rhythmic Gymnastics European Championships
Rhythmic Gymnastics European Championships